The Forestry Research Institute of Ghana (FORIG) is a research institution under the Council for Scientific and Industrial Research of Ghana.

References

Research institutes in Ghana
Ghana
Forestry in Ghana